Misery Loves Cabernet is a 2009 chick lit novel by Kim Gruenenfelder. A sequel to 2005's critically-acclaimed international bestseller A Total Waste of Makeup, the book continues the adventures of Los Angeles personal assistant Charlize "Charlie" Edwards and her friends. Library Journal credited Gruenenfelder for her "well-written characters" and "wicked sense of humor," as well as for capturing the Hollywood scene accurately through her background as a screenwriter.

Reception 
The book received generally favorable reviews from critics and audiences. Lauded by Romantic Times as "delightfully funny", the Chicago Sun-Times praised the book as "a sweet tale of the Hollywood dating scene." The novel also received praise from authors MaryJanice Davidson and Cecelia Ahern.

References 

2009 American novels
St. Martin's Press books
Chick lit novels